Los Twist was an Argentine rock group formed on March 30, 1982, in Buenos Aires. Their music was inspired in the rockabilly of the 1950s and their lyrics contained strong political statements disguised with humor. The band officially broke up on April 30, 2012.

Among their most famous songs are: Pensé que se trataba de cieguitos, El rockabilly de los narcisos, Ricardo Rubén, El estudiante, Estoy herido, etc.

Members of Los Twist 
 Pipo Cipolatti (guitar and voice)
 Daniel Melingo (guitar)
 Fabiana Cantilo (vocals: first 2 albums)
 Eduardo Cano (bass: first 2 albums)
 Bruno Toppino (drums: first 2 albums)
 Gonzalo Palacios (wind instruments)
 Damian Toppino (vocals: third album)
 Santiago Toppino and Gustavo Pintos (vocals 1991-1996)

Discography
The band started playing in the early 1980s; their albums include: 
"La dicha en movimiento" (1983), 
"Cachetazo al vicio" (1984), 
"La máquina del tiempo" (1985), 
"Cataratas musicales" (1991), 
"El álbum" (1993), 
"Con el 5 en la espalda" (1994) 
"Explosivo '96" (1995)

Singles
Some of their hits include: "Pensé que se trataba de cieguitos", "Ritmo colocado", "Jugando hula-hula" from "La dicha en movimiento" "El hombre de la barra de hielo" (1983) and "El estudiante" from "Cataratas musicales" (1991).

References

Argentine rock music groups
Musical groups established in 1982
1982 establishments in Argentina